Sven Sonnenberg (born 19 January 1999) is a German professional footballer who plays as a centre-back for Heracles.

Club career
Sonnenberg made his professional debut for Hansa Rostock in the 3. Liga on 3 August 2019, coming on as a substitute in the 77th minute for Adam Straith in a 1–0 away loss against SpVgg Unterhaching.

References

External links
 
 
 
 
 Career stats & Profile - Voetbal International

1999 births
Living people
German footballers
Association football central defenders
Germany youth international footballers
3. Liga players
Regionalliga players
1. FC Köln II players
FC Hansa Rostock players
Heracles Almelo players
German expatriate footballers
German expatriate sportspeople in the Netherlands
Expatriate footballers in the Netherlands